Two ships of the Royal Australian Navy (RAN) have been named HMAS Stalwart.

  an  launched in 1918, decommissioned in 1925, and scrapped in 1937
 , a destroyer tender launched in 1966, decommissioned in 1990, and sold into civilian service
 , is a replenishment oiler, the second of the  based on the Spanish Cantabria class. The keel was laid in 2018.

See also
 , a frigate of the Republic of Singapore Navy.
 , two ships of the United States Navy.
 , a surveillance ship of the United States Military Sealift Command.

Royal Australian Navy ship names